Vincent Madelgarius, aka Maelceadar, Benedictine monk, died 677. His feast day is September 20.

Belgian accounts
Belgian sources state that Vincent Madelgarus was born in Strépy, Belgium, sometime in the late 6th or early 7th century; died 677 in Soignies; and was a Benedictine monk who established two monasteries in Hainaut. One of these was at Hautmont (now in France), the other at Soignies.

Madelgarus was sent by Dagobert I to Ireland. His wife was Waltrude.

Irish accounts
However, according to John O'Hanlon, his real name was Maelceadar (Mael Ceadar), he was a Count of Hainault, and he was a native of Ireland. Speaking of Vincent Madelgarus's daughter, Madelberta, abbess of Maubeuge, O'Hanlon states:

"because her religious father is held to have sought from Ireland the shores of France, where he was renowned as a warrior, and where he attained the distinction of being known as Count of Hannonia, or Hainault, in reward for his services, as also because with his religious wife, Waldetrude, he visited Ireland, on a mission entrusted to him, by Dagobert I., King of France. Moreover, on her father's side, St. Madelberta. had Irish blood in her veins, and doubtless she inherited many of those happy dispositions, that rendered her worthy to rank with so many other members of a truly noble and holy family. ... St. Madelberga or Madelberta was the daughter of Saints Maelceadar or Vincentius and Waldetrude. Their children were Landric or Landry, afterwards Bishop of Meaux, or of Metz; Aldetrude and Malberta, their daughters, and Dentelin, who was the youngest of that family."

"In the Low Countries, they represent St. Madelbert in a group, with her father, St. Vincent of Soignies, and her mother St. Waldetrude, St. Aldetrude her sister, as also her brothers, St. Landry, Bishop of Meaux, and St. Dentlin."

Elsewhere in the same volume, O'Hanlon has further remarks to make about Vincent Madelgarus and his family:

"The father of St. Aldetrude was Maelceadar or Maldegarius, also called Vincent, the latter name having been received on account of numerous victories he obtained, and for this reason, too, he was created Count of Hainault, in the Low Countries, by Dagobert, the renowned King of the Franks. This latter monarch to increase those honours gave his relative St. Waldetrude, or Waldetrudis, in marriage. Their alliance was the happy occasion, for giving at a future time four holy children to the Church, viz. : St. Landric, Bishop of Meaux ; St. Dentelinus, Patron of Rosensis, in Cleves ; St. Aldetrude and St. Madelberta."

References
Lives of the Irish Saints, Volume 9, Canon John O'Hanlon, 1873–1905.

External links
Madelgarus' page at Catholic.org
French Wikipedia

677 deaths
7th-century Irish people
Irish Benedictines
Belgian Roman Catholic saints
Colombanian saints
Year of birth unknown